Edouardo Agnelli may refer to:

Edoardo Agnelli (entrepreneur, born 1954) (1954–2000), the eldest child and only son of Gianni Agnelli, the industrialist patriarch of Fiat known after conversion to Islam as Mahdi Agnelli
Edoardo Agnelli (entrepreneur, born 1831) (1831–1871), Italian entrepreneur and politician
Edoardo Agnelli (entrepreneur, born 1892) (1892–1935), Italian entrepreneur and industrialist and principal family shareholder of the Italian car company Fiat